Niels Marthinsen (born 1963) is a Danish composer in the classical tradition. He studied composition at the Royal Academy of Music in Aarhus from 1982-1990 as a student of Per Nørgård. Other teachers include Hans Abrahamsen, Steen Pade, Karl Aage Rasmussen and Poul Ruders.

He received the Victor Borge Prize in 1993, the H. C. Lumbye Prize in 2008. The 2006 Danish National Opera production of Marthinsen’s opera Skriftestolen received the Danish Reumert Prize in 2007 for Opera of the Year.

List of works

 1986 Erscheinungen (orchester)
 1988 Airborne (flute, piano, violon, and cello)
 1988 Echoes of a Dove
 1988 Sept Poèsies des saisons japonaises
 1989 Olé
 1990 Vulcan's Forge
 1990 Burst
 1992 Rhapsodie Espagnole
 1992 Cradle Song
 1992 Concerto
 1992 Wildlife
 1992 Minotaurus
 1992 Shadow Figures
 1993 Den Forstenende Skov
 1993 Abgesang
 1993 Chimes at Midnight
 1993 Heldenleben
 1993 Panorama
 1994 Columbus
 1994 Bolero
 1994 Cupid and Death
 1994 Reveille
 1994 Slagtøjskoncert
 1994 Tubakoncert
 1995 Devil in Disguise
 1995 Strygekvartet
 1995 En Miniature
 1996 Symphony
 1996 Lyriske stykker
 1996 Angels and Insects
 1996 Heroisk Etude
 1996 A Bright Kind of High
 1997 Love and Treachery
 1997 Klavertrio
 1997 Kærlighed og forræderi
 1998 Moonwalk
 1998 Byen og øjnene
 1999 Canto alla secunda Giornata
 1999 Introduction and Three Allegros
 1999 Outland
 2001 Maestro
 2003 Et Familieselskab i Helsingør
 2004 Skriftestolen - operatrailer i fire afsnit
 2004 Monstersymfoni
 2004 Maestrovariationer
 2005 Den gamle vandrende Ridder
 2006 Hul igennem
 2006 Skriftestolen
 2007 The Monkey
 2007 The Poet
 2008 Burning Fiery Furnace
 2008 Syndfloden over Norderney
 2009 Kongen af Himmelby - Demo
 2009 Symfoni nr. 2 - Snapshot Symphony
 2009 Frøen
 2009 In the Shadow of the Bat
 2009 Atlantis Revisited
 2009 Kongen af Himmelby

References

1963 births
Living people
Danish classical composers
Danish male classical composers
20th-century classical composers
21st-century classical composers
Pupils of Per Nørgård
20th-century Danish male musicians
21st-century male musicians